Miramar is a district of the Montes de Oro canton, in the Puntarenas province of Costa Rica.

Geography 
Miramar has an area of  km² and an elevation of  metres.

Demographics 

For the 2011 census, Miramar had a population of  inhabitants.

Transportation

Road transportation 
The district is covered by the following road routes:
 National Route 1
 National Route 144
 National Route 615

References 

Districts of Puntarenas Province
Populated places in Puntarenas Province